20α-Dihydrotrengestone (20α-DHTG), also known as 20α-hydroxytrengestone, as well as 6-chloro-20(S)-hydroxy-9β,10α-pregna-1,4,6-trien-3-one, is a progestin and the major active metabolite of trengestone. It appears that trengestone is a prodrug of 20α-DHTG, as it is largely transformed into this metabolite when given orally in humans. 20α-DHTG has potent progestogenic activity similarly to trengestone.

See also
 20α-Dihydrodydrogesterone
 20α-Dihydroprogesterone

References

Secondary alcohols
Chloroarenes
Human drug metabolites
Enones
Pregnanes
Progestogens
Conjugated dienes